The Million Pound Radio Show was a long-running radio programme written by and featuring Nick Revell and Andy Hamilton that aired on Britain's BBC Radio 4. A series of sketches, interspersed with dialogue between the two, the show ran for at least six series between 1985 and 1992 with associated Christmas specials, along with a World Cup special in 1990 and a Millennium special broadcast in 1996 ("We reckon that by the time the year 2000 arrives the mere mention of the word 'millennium' will be enough to send people into life-threatening comas"). Regular Andy Hamilton players such as Felicity Montagu also turned up and Harry Enfield appeared in many programmes.

The show became popular in the UK through a sketch involving Pirates requiring better employment conditions ("We wants a training day!" "Aye! And a creche!") being repeatedly played on BBC Radio 1; the only cassette release of the series capitalised on this and had "Includes the famous pirate sketch!" emblazoned on the cover.

The Million Pound Radio Show is today quite frequently broadcast on the BBC Radio 4 Extra channel, on digital radio and the internet.

In an interview given on BBC Radio 7's "I Did It My Way", broadcast on 5 April 2008, Andy Hamilton said that there was a chance of a 'reunion' programme, perhaps at the next election.   However, he made no firm commitment.

Series 1 (August 1985)  
Later on in Our Sports Feature.
Tulula Blaze Remembers Ivor Novello.
Drinking & Driving Foreign Diplomat.
Now A Look Ahead To Monday on Radio 4 – Fame – Quite Well Respected

Series 2 (September 1986) 
How Come Nostradamus Never Won The Pools
Government New Aid Scheme For Small Business
Astronaut Mugged in Space
Third Test at Lords
Eta Terrorist Bomb Campaign
Rupert Murdoch: Sun Goes Upmarket
Leonardo da Vinci
Shipping Forecast

Series 3 (October 1987) 
The Man Who Didn't Belong
The Man Who Changed
They Came From All Good Stores
The Devil's Disciples
Invaders From The Planet Dull
Journey to the Centre of the Brain

Series 4 (March 1989) 
Page 3 Girl
Guest Will Be Bros
European onion threat and a whale of a time with Moby Dick
Buckingham Palace revelations and government food advice
The secret of Stonehenge, and The Day Truth Broke Out.
A Ronald Ambrose Physics Lecture, and poorly Andy's National Health Service choices
Christmas Special
World Cup Special (1990)

BBC Radio comedy programmes
BBC Radio 4 programmes

Series 5 (July 1991) 
Pirates
Dead President
Weapons Fair
Country life
Time
Golden Boot
Election Special (1992)
Columbus Special (1992)
State of the Nation Special (1994)
Millennium Special (1996)

References

https://www.bbc.co.uk/programmes/b00bwv0f/episodes/player